E39 may refer to:
 Tetrasodium EDTA, a cosmetics additive
 BMW 5 Series (E39), the BMW 5 Series mid-size luxury car manufactured between 1995 and 2003
 European route E39, a part of Norwegian national road system
 HMS E39, a British E class submarine
 E39 screw, a type of Edison screw
 Asahikawa-Monbetsu Expressway, route E39 in Japan
 Penang Outer Ring Road, route E39 in Malaysia